Niweat Siriwong (born July 18, 1977) is a Thai retired footballer. Niweat is a vastly experienced player and has played overseas in Singapore and Vietnam during his career. He was known for his long-range powerful free kicks.

Honours
International
Thailand
AFF Championship: 2000. Runner-up (3): 2007, 2008, 2012
T&T Cup: 2008
Clubs
Sinthana
Thai Premier League: Champion (1998). Runner-up (1997)
Thai FA Cup: 1997
Kor Royal Cup: 1997, 1998

International career
Niweat captained the Thailand squad which won the 2008 T&T Cup.

He also played in the 2012 King's Cup and 2012 AFF Suzuki Cup.

International goals

References

1977 births
Living people
Niweat Siriwong
Niweat Siriwong
Niweat Siriwong
Sembawang Rangers FC players
Gombak United FC players
Niweat Siriwong
Niweat Siriwong
Niweat Siriwong
Niweat Siriwong
Singapore Premier League players
Expatriate footballers in Vietnam
Expatriate footballers in Singapore
Thai expatriate footballers
Thai expatriate sportspeople in Vietnam
Thai expatriate sportspeople in Singapore
Niweat Siriwong
2000 AFC Asian Cup players
2004 AFC Asian Cup players
2007 AFC Asian Cup players
Association football central defenders
Niweat Siriwong
Footballers at the 1998 Asian Games
Niweat Siriwong
Niweat Siriwong